Jack Ryan (24 June 1873 – 30 November 1931) was an Australian rules footballer who played with St Kilda in the Victorian Football League (VFL).

References

External links 

1873 births
1931 deaths
Australian rules footballers from Victoria (Australia)
St Kilda Football Club players